Markerville/Safron Farms Aerodrome  is located  north northwest of Markerville, Alberta, Canada.

References

Registered aerodromes in Alberta
Red Deer County